|}

The Ebor Handicap is a flat handicap horse race in Great Britain open to horses aged four years or older. It is run at York over a distance of 1 mile 5 furlongs and 188 yards (2,787 metres). It is scheduled to take place each year in August.

History
The event is named after the shortened form of Eboracum, the Roman name for York. It was first run in 1843, and it was originally known as the Great Ebor Handicap. The race was introduced by John Orton, a newly appointed Clerk of the Course at York.

The planned running of the Ebor Handicap in 2008 was abandoned because of a waterlogged track. It was replaced by an event at Newbury called the Newburgh Handicap, a reference to the town's original Norman name.

The race is now held on the final day of York's four-day Ebor Festival meeting, and it is the most valuable flat handicap in Europe. The prize money was increased to £500,000 from the 2018 running and then to £1,000,000 from 2019, making it the first British handicap race worth £1,000,000. In connection with the prize money increase three-year-olds were excluded from the race from the 2019 running.  The prize money for the 2020 running of the race was reduced, in line with similar reductions in prize money of all British horse racing, due in part to the Covid-19 pandemic.

Records

Most successful horse (2 wins):
 Flint Jack – 1922, 1923

Leading jockey (5 wins):
 Lester Piggott – Gladness (1958), Primera (1959), Die Hard (1961), Tintagel II (1970), Jupiter Island (1983)

Leading trainer (5 wins):
 Tom Dawson – Godfrey (1844), Mark Tapley (1850), Pax (1860), Makeshift (1862), Mandrake (1867)

Winners since 1976
 Weights given in stones and pounds.

Earlier winners

 1843: Pagan
 1844: Godfrey
 1845: Coheiress
 1846: Arthur
 1847: Mathematician
 1848: Meaux
 1849: The Hero
 1850: Mark Tapley
 1851: Nancy
 1852: Adine
 1853: Pantomime
 1854: The Grand Inquisitor
 1855: Vandal
 1856: Warlock
 1857: El Hakim
 1858: Vedette
 1859: Underhand
 1860: Pax
 1861: Rising Sun
 1862: Makeshift
 1863: Golden Pledge
 1864: Raglan
 1865: Verdant
 1866: Westwick
 1867: Mandrake
 1868: Fair Wind
 1869: Fortunio
 1870: Paganini
 1871: Not Out
 1872: Albert Victor
 1873: Louise Victoria
 1874: Chivalrous
 1875: Lily Agnes
 1876: Lilian
 1877: Il Gladiatore
 1878: Caerau
 1879: Isonomy
 1880: Novice
 1881: Mother Shipton
 1882: Victor Emanuel
 1883: Corrie Roy
 1884: Ben Alder
 1885: Mate
 1886: Le Caissier
 1887: Silence
 1888: Nappa
 1889: King Monmouth
 1890: Silver Spur
 1891: Buccaneer
 1892: Alice
 1893: Senaputty
 1894: Quilon
 1895: Llanthony
 1896: Dingle Bay
 1897: Harvest Money
 1898: Invincible II
 1899: Cassock's Pride
 1900: Jiffy II
 1901: Gyp
 1902: Wargrave
 1903: McYardley
 1904: Warwolf
 1905: The Page
 1906: Golden Measure
 1907: Wuffy
 1908: Rousay
 1909: Dibs
 1910: Claretoi
 1911: Pillo
 1912: Election
 1913: Junior
 1914–18: no race
 1919: Race Rock
 1920: Iron Hand
 1921: March Along
 1922: Flint Jack
 1923: Flint Jack
 1924: Marvex
 1925: Chapeau
 1926: Pons Asinorum
 1927: Cap-a-Pie
 1928: Cinq a Sept
 1929: Bonny Boy
 1930: Coaster / Gentlemen's Relish *
 1931: Brown Jack
 1932: Cat o' Nine Tails
 1933: Dictum
 1934: Alcazar
 1935: Museum
 1936: Penny Royal
 1937: Weathervane
 1938: Foxglove II
 1939: Owenstown
 1940–42: no race
 1943: Yorkshire Hussar
 1944: The Kernel
 1945: Wayside Inn
 1946: Foxtrot
 1947: Procne
 1948: Donino
 1949: Miraculous Atom
 1950: Cadzow Oak
 1951: Bob
 1952: Signification
 1953: Norooz
 1954: By Thunder!
 1955: Hyperion Kid
 1956: Donald
 1957: Morecambe
 1958: Gladness
 1959: Primera
 1960: Persian Road
 1961: Die Hard
 1962: Sostenuto
 1963: Partholon
 1964: Proper Pride
 1965: Twelfth Man
 1966: Lomond
 1967: Ovaltine
 1968: Alignment
 1969: Big Hat
 1970: Tintagel II
 1971: Knotty Pine
 1972: Crazy Rhythm
 1973: Bonne Noel
 1974: Anji
 1975: Dakota

See also
 Horse racing in Great Britain
 List of British flat horse races

References

 Paris-Turf: 
 Racing Post:
 galopp-sieger.de – Ebor Handicap.
 pedigreequery.com – Ebor Handicap – York.
 
 Race Recordings 

Flat races in Great Britain
York Racecourse
Open long distance horse races
Recurring sporting events established in 1843
1843 establishments in England